474th may refer to:

474th Air Expeditionary Group, provisional United States Air Force unit assigned to Air Combat Command
474th Bombardment Squadron, inactive United States Air Force unit
474th Infantry Regiment (United States) or 74th Infantry Regiment (United States), Regular infantry regiment in the United States Army
474th Tactical Fighter Squadron, inactive United States Air Force unit
474th Tactical Fighter Wing, inactive United States Air Force unit

See also
474 (number)
474, the year 474 (CDLXXIV) of the Julian calendar
474 BC